CBX-FM is a Canadian radio station, broadcasting at 90.9 FM in Edmonton, Alberta. It broadcasts the programming of the CBC Music network.

CBX-FM was launched on June 27, 1979. In 2004, CBC Edmonton operations moved into a new digital broadcast facility downtown, bringing all operations of Radio and TV, under one roof. The old TV facility on 75th Street had , while the Radio building on 51st Ave. had . The new combined facility has 38,700 total square feet. It is located at the Edmonton City Centre, on Winston Churchill Square. Its transmitter is located in Sherwood Park.

As of February 28, 2021, CBX-FM is the 16th-most-listened-to radio station in the Edmonton market according to a PPM data report released by Numeris.

References

External links
CBX-FM history - Canadian Communications Foundation

BX
BX
Radio stations established in 1978
1978 establishments in Alberta